Streptomyces bambusae is a bacterium species from the genus of Streptomyces which has been isolated from rhizosphere soil from bamboos on Korea. Streptomyces bambusae has antifungal and antibacterial activities.

See also 
 List of Streptomyces species

References 

 

bambusae
Bacteria described in 2016